No More Tears Sister is a 2005 documentary film about the leftist revolutionary Rajini Thiranagama who joined the guerrilla group the Tamil Tigers in reaction to a brutal government crackdown in Sri Lanka. Thiranagama ultimately left the group, however, when she realized it was more a murderous group than a revolutionary force. She was assassinated on September 21, 1989, when she was only 35.

No More Tears Sister was written and directed by Helene Klodawsky and was the season premiere for the 19th season of the PBS Point of View series in 2006. The film received the Gemini Award for Best Photography in a Documentary Program or Series, presented to cinematographer François Dagenais.

With so little documentary footage available, the film makes extensive use of dramatic recreations.

References

External links 
 Official Site
 No More Tears Sister on IMDb
 P.O.V. No More Tears Sister - PBS's site dedicated to the film

2005 films
POV (TV series) films
National Film Board of Canada documentaries
Documentary films about revolutionaries
Documentary films about violence against women
Canadian Screen Award-winning television shows
Liberation Tigers of Tamil Eelam
Documentary films about the Sri Lankan Civil War
2000s English-language films
2000s American films
2000s Canadian films